Major General Hugh Shaw  (4 February 1839 – 25 August 1904) was a senior British Army officer and a recipient of the Victoria Cross, the highest award for gallantry in the face of the enemy that can be awarded to British and Commonwealth forces.

Early life
Shaw was born in Madras, British India, on 4 February 1839, the son of James Shaw, an Inspector General of Hospitals in Madras, and Ann Hay.  He married Emily Grace Sheffield on 21 June 1870.

Victoria Cross
Shaw was 25 years old, and a captain in the 18th Regiment (later The Royal Irish Regiment), during the New Zealand Wars on 24 January 1865 when the following deed led to the award of the Victoria Cross:

He later achieved the rank of Major General. His Victoria Cross is displayed at the National Army Museum in Chelsea, London.

References

External links
Location of grave and VC medal (Hampshire)

British Army generals
New Zealand Wars recipients of the Victoria Cross
British recipients of the Victoria Cross
1839 births
1904 deaths
British military personnel of the New Zealand Wars
Military personnel from Chennai
Royal Irish Regiment (1684–1922) officers
British Army personnel of the Crimean War
British military personnel of the Indian Rebellion of 1857
British military personnel of the Second Anglo-Afghan War
British Army personnel of the Mahdist War
Graduates of the Royal Military College, Sandhurst
British Army recipients of the Victoria Cross
Burials in Hampshire
Military personnel of British India